Franz Loskarn (3 May 1890 – 22 April 1978) was a German film actor.

Selected filmography
 Behind Monastery Walls (1928)
 Almenrausch and Edelweiss (1928)
 Love on Skis (1928)
 Restless Hearts (1928)
 Tracks in the Snow (1929)
 When the Evening Bells Ring (1930)
 Um das Menschenrecht (1934)
 Marriage Strike (1935)
 The Hunter of Fall (1936)
 A Heart Beats for You (1949)
 Royal Children (1950)
 Kissing Is No Sin (1950)
 Two in One Suit (1950)
 Trouble in Paradise (1950)
 Monks, Girls and Hungarian Soldiers (1952)
 Marriage Strike (1953)
 The Monastery's Hunter (1953)
 Hubertus Castle (1954)
The Blacksmith of St. Bartholomae (1955)
 I Know What I'm Living For (1955)
 Thomas Müntzer (1956)
 Two Bavarians in St. Pauli (1956)
 The Vulture Wally (1956)
 The Twins from Zillertal (1957)
 Jacqueline (1959)

References

External links
 

1890 births
1978 deaths
German male film actors
German male silent film actors
Male actors from Munich
20th-century German male actors